Highway 177 (AR 177, Ark. 177, and Hwy. 177) is a north–south state highway that runs in north central Arkansas. The route runs  from Herron north over the Norfork Dam, then south to Pineville.

Route description

AR 177 begins in Herron and heads north to meet AR 5 in Norfork. It concurs with AR 5 north until Salesville. North of Salesville, AR 177 serves the Norfork National Fish Hatchery, the Quarry Cove Use Area, and bridges the Norfork Dam. The route turns south to pass through Jordan and Iuka before terminating at AR 223 in Pineville. AR 177 is a 2-lane paved highway for its entire length.

Major intersections
Mile markers reset at concurrencies.

|-
| align=center colspan=5|  concurrency north, 
|-

See also

References

177
Transportation in Baxter County, Arkansas
Transportation in Izard County, Arkansas